The twelfth and final season of the American television series Bones premiered on January 3, 2017, on Fox and concluded on March 28, 2017. The final season consists of 12 episodes and aired Tuesdays at 9:00 pm ET.

Cast and characters

Main cast
 Emily Deschanel as Dr. Temperance "Bones" Brennan, a forensic anthropologist at the Jeffersonian, and wife of Seeley Booth
 David Boreanaz as  FBI Special Agent Seeley Booth and husband of Temperance Brennan
 Michaela Conlin as Angela Montenegro, a forensic artist and wife of Jack Hodgins
 Tamara Taylor as Dr. Camille Saroyan, a forensic pathologist and the head of the forensic division
 T. J. Thyne as Dr. Jack Hodgins, an entomologist, mineralogist, palynologist, and forensic chemist, and husband of Angela Montenegro.
 John Boyd as James Aubrey, an FBI agent who works under Booth

Recurring cast
 Patricia Belcher as Caroline Julian, a prosecutor who often works with the team
 Eric Millegan as Dr. Zack Addy, former Jeffersonian employee
 Eddie McClintock as Tim "Sully" Sullivan, a former FBI agent with whom Brennan had a previous relationship
 Stephen Fry as Gordon Wyatt, Booth's former psychiatrist, now a chef
 Ryan O'Neal as Max Brennan, Temperance's father
 Sara Rue as Karen Delfs, a behavioral analyst
 Sunnie Pelant as Christine Booth, Seeley and Temperance's daughter
 Guy Boyd as Philip Aubrey, James's father
 Cyndi Lauper as Avalon Harmonia, a psychic
 Tiffany Hines as Michelle Welton, Cam's adopted daughter

Interns
 Michael Grant Terry as Wendell Bray
 Carla Gallo as Daisy Wick
 Pej Vahdat as Dr. Arastoo Vaziri
 Laura Spencer as Jessica Warren
 Joel David Moore as Dr. Colin Fisher
 Ignacio Serricchio as Dr. Rodolfo Fuentes
 Eugene Byrd as Dr. Clark Edison

Production
Fox renewed Bones for a 12-episode final season on February 25, 2016. The season was initially announced to debut in the fall of 2016, but Fox delayed the premiere until January 3, 2017. Former series regular Eric Millegan, who returned in the season 11 finale, continues his role as Zack Addy in the final season. The season features the return of former recurring characters, including Eddie McClintock as Tim "Sully" Sullivan, who recurred during season two, and Stephen Fry as Gordon Wyatt, who made guest appearances in seasons two, four and five. Betty White reprises her season 11 role as Dr. Beth Mayer in the tenth episode, while veteran actors Ed Asner and Hal Holbrook guest star in the third episode. Filming of the season, and of the entire series, wrapped up on December 15, 2016.

Episodes

Reception
On Rotten Tomatoes, the season has an approval rating of 93% with an average score of 7.7 out of 10 based on 14 reviews. The website's critical consensus reads, "A charming conclusion, Bones final season digs deeps and delivers a fitting send-off to a beloved series."

DVD release
The twelfth and final season of Bones was released on DVD (subtitled "The Final Chapter") in region 1 on June 13, 2017. The set includes all 12 episodes of season twelve and special features include a gag reel and a featurette "Back to the Lab: A Bones Retrospective".

References

External links
 
 

Season 12
2017 American television seasons